Woodward High School may refer to one of several high schools in the United States:

Woodward High School (Cincinnati, Ohio) — Cincinnati, Ohio
Woodward High School (Toledo, Ohio) — Toledo, Ohio
Charles W. Woodward High School — Rockville, Maryland